Walter Burrell  may refer to:
Walter Burrell (1777–1831), Member of Parliament (MP) for Sussex 1812–31
Sir Walter Burrell, 5th Baronet  (1814–1886), British barrister and freemason, Conservative MP for New Shoreham 1876–85
Sir Walter Burrell, 8th Baronet, of the Burrell baronets

See also
Burrell (disambiguation)